Jan Bonga (born 23 July 1964) is a Swiss windsurfer. He competed in the Division II event at the 1988 Summer Olympics.

References

External links
 
 

1964 births
Living people
Swiss windsurfers
Swiss male sailors (sport)
Olympic sailors of Switzerland
Sailors at the 1988 Summer Olympics – Division II
Place of birth missing (living people)
20th-century Swiss people